The Gravity Recovery and Interior Laboratory (GRAIL) was an American lunar science mission in NASA's Discovery Program which used high-quality gravitational field mapping of the Moon to determine its interior structure. The two small spacecraft GRAIL A (Ebb) and GRAIL B (Flow)  were launched on 10 September 2011 aboard a single launch vehicle: the most-powerful configuration of a Delta II, the 7920H-10. GRAIL A separated from the rocket about nine minutes after launch, GRAIL B followed about eight minutes later. They arrived at their orbits around the Moon 25 hours apart. The first probe entered orbit on 31 December 2011 and the second followed on 1 January 2012. The two spacecraft impacted the Lunar surface on December 17, 2012.

Overview

Maria Zuber of the Massachusetts Institute of Technology was GRAIL's principal investigator. NASA's Jet Propulsion Laboratory managed the project. NASA budgeted US$496 million for the program to include spacecraft and instrument development, launch, mission operations, and science support.  Upon launch the spacecraft were named GRAIL A and GRAIL B and a contest was opened to school children to select names.  Nearly 900 classrooms from 45 states, Puerto Rico and the District of Columbia, participated in the contest.  The winning names, Ebb and Flow, were suggested by 4th grade students at Emily Dickinson Elementary School in Bozeman, Montana.

Each spacecraft transmitted and received telemetry from the other spacecraft and Earth-based facilities. By measuring the change in distance between the two spacecraft, the gravity field and geological structure of the Moon was obtained. The two spacecraft were able to detect very small changes in the distance between one another. Changes in distance as small as one micrometre were detectable and measurable. The gravitational field of the Moon was mapped in unprecedented detail.

Objectives
 Map the structure of the lunar crust and lithosphere
 Understand the asymmetric thermal evolution of the Moon
 Determine the subsurface structure of impact basins and the origin of lunar mascons
 Ascertain the temporal evolution of crustal brecciation and magmatism
 Constrain the deep interior structure of the Moon
 Place limits on the size of the Moon's inner core

The data collection phase of the mission lasted from 7 March 2012 to 29 May 2012, for a total of 88 days. A second phase, at a lower altitude, of data collection began 31 August 2012, and was followed by 12 months of data analysis. On 5 December 2012 NASA released a gravity map of the Moon made from GRAIL data. The knowledge acquired will aid understanding of the evolutionary history of the terrestrial planets and computations of lunar orbits.

Spacecraft

Instruments

 Ka band Lunar Gravity Ranging System (LGRS), derived from the Gravity Recovery and Climate Experiment (GRACE) instrument.  90% of the GRACE software was reused for GRAIL.
 Radio science beacon (RSB)
 Moon Knowledge Acquired by Middle school students (MoonKAM). Each MoonKAM system (one per spacecraft) consists of a digital video controller and four camera heads.  Click here  for a MoonKAM photo from lunar orbit.

Propulsion
Thrusters aboard each spacecraft were capable of producing . 
The propulsion subsystem consisted of a main fuel tank and a Re-repressurization system which were activated shortly after lunar orbit insertion.

Mission profile

Launch attempts
All times are in EDT (UTC-4).

Transit phase

Unlike the Apollo program missions, which took three days to reach the Moon, GRAIL made use of a three- to four-month low-energy trans-lunar cruise well outside the Moon's orbit and passing near the Sun-Earth Lagrange point L1 before looping back to rendezvous with the Moon. The very tight tolerances in the flight plan left little room for error correction leading to a launch window lasting one second and providing only two launch opportunities per day.

Science phase
The primary science phase of GRAIL lasted for 88 days, from 7 March 2012 to 29 May 2012. It was followed by a second science phase that ran from 8 Aug 2012 into early Dec 2012.

The gravity mapping technique was similar to that used by Gravity Recovery and Climate Experiment (GRACE), and the spacecraft design was based on XSS-11.

The spacecraft were operated over the 88-day acquisition phase, divided into three 27.3 day long nadir-pointed mapping cycles. Twice each day there was an 8-hour pass in view of the Deep Space Network for transmission of science and "E/PO MoonKam" data.

The first student-requested MoonKam images were taken by Ebb from 2012 March 15-17 and downlinked to Earth March 20. More than 2,700 schools spanning 52 countries were using the MoonKAM cameras. 

Flow's MoonKam camera captured LRO as it flew by at a distance of about 12 miles (20 km) on May 3. It's the first footage of a moon-orbiting robotic spacecraft taken by another one.

Terminal phase

Final experiment and mission end
At the end of the science phase and a mission extension, the spacecraft were powered down and decommissioned over a five-day period. The spacecraft impacted the lunar surface on December 17, 2012. Ebb, the lead spacecraft in formation, impacted first. Flow impacted moments later. A final experiment was conducted during the final days of the mission. Main engines aboard the spacecraft were fired, depleting remaining fuel. Data from that effort will be used by mission planners to validate fuel consumption computer models to improve predictions of fuel needs for future missions. NASA has announced that the crash site will be named after GRAIL collaborator and first American woman in space, Sally Ride.

Results 
Gravity passes through matter. In addition to surface mass, a high-resolution gravity field gives a blurred, but useful, look below the surface. Analyses of the GRAIL data have produced a series of scientific results for the Moon. 

 The resolution of the gravity field has improved by a large amount over pre-GRAIL results. Early analyses gave the Gravitation of the Moon with fields of degree and order 420 and 660. Subsequent analyses have resulted in higher degree and order fields. Maps of the gravity field were made.
 The crustal density and porosity were determined. The crust was fragmented by large ancient impacts.
 Long narrow linear features were found that are interpreted to be ancient tabular intrusions or dikes formed by magma.
Combining gravity and Lunar Laser Ranging data gives the 3 principal moments of inertia. The moments indicate that a dense core is small.
Combining gravity and lunar Topography, 74 circular impact basins were identified. Strong increases in gravity that are associated with circular impact basins are mascons discovered by Muller and Sjogren. The strongest gravity anomalies are from basins filled with dense mare material, but the strong gravity also requires that the boundary between the crust and denser mantle be warped upward. Where the crust is thicker, there may be no mare fill but the crust-mantle boundary is still warped upward.
The radius, density, and rigidity of interior layers is inferred.
The Orientale basin is the youngest and best-preserved impact basin on the Moon. The gravity field of this 3-ring basin was mapped at high resolution.

See also

 List of artificial objects on the Moon
 Satellite gravimetry
 Selenoid

References

External links

 GRAIL: Mission NASA
 NASA GRAIL (Gravity Recovery and Interior Laboratory) – mission home page
 MIT GRAIL Home Page
 NASA Science Missions: GRAIL (Gravity Recovery and Interior Laboratory)
 NASA 360 New Worlds New Discoveries 2/2 Retrieved 6/3/2011.
 Behind The Scenes of My NASA GRAIL Experience – Day One (AM)

Discovery Program
Space probes launched in 2011
Missions to the Moon
Destroyed space probes
G
Spacecraft that orbited the Moon
Spacecraft that impacted the Moon
Articles containing video clips
2012 on the Moon
Twin satellites
Gravimetry